Kalyvia ("huts") is a village in the Heraklion regional unit on southern Crete in Greece.  The local area was important in the Minoan era, as manifested by the extensive ruins of nearby Phaistos, a major palatial settlement of the Bronze Age.

See also
Phaistos
Hagia Triada

References

Populated places in Heraklion (regional unit)